The Fairy Feller's Master-Stroke is a painting by English artist Richard Dadd. It was begun in 1855 and worked on until 1864. Dadd painted it while incarcerated in the State Criminal Lunatic Asylum of Bethlem Royal Hospital, where he was confined after he murdered his father in 1843. It was commissioned by George Henry Haydon, who was head steward of the hospital at the time.

History
Dadd had begun his career as a painter of fairy paintings before the onset of his mental illness. After he was committed, he was encouraged to resume painting. G. H. Haydon was impressed by Dadd's artistic efforts and asked for a fairy painting of his own. Dadd worked on the painting for nine years, paying microscopic attention to detail and using a layering technique to produce 3D-like results. Although it is generally regarded as his most important work, Dadd himself considered the painting to be unfinished (the background of the lower left corner is only sketched in). 

He signed the back of the canvas with the inscription: "The Fairy-Feller's Master-Stroke, Painted for G. H. Haydon Esqre by Rd. Dadd quasi 1855–64". According to Patricia Allderidge, 'quasi' "may mean that it was set aside during that period or that it took a long time to start". The end date, 1864, coincides with Dadd's transfer to Broadmoor Hospital in Berkshire, the asylum where he spent the remaining 21 years of his life.

In order to give context to his work, Dadd subsequently wrote a long poem by the name of Elimination of a Picture & its Subject—called The Fellers' Master Stroke in which each of the characters appearing in the picture is given a name and purpose—including myriad references to old English folklore and Shakespeare—in an apparent attempt to show that the painting's unique composition was not merely a product of random, wild inspiration.

From Haydon the painting passed to collector Alfred Morrison, whose daughter Katharine Gatty gave it to the war poet Siegfried Sassoon when he married her daughter Hester in 1933. Sassoon withdrew it from a  Sotheby's auction on 29 May 1963 and presented it to the Tate Gallery "in memory of his friend and fellow officer Julian Dadd, a grandnephew of the artist, and of his [Julian's] two brothers [Stephen Gabriel and Edmund] who gave their lives in the First World War". Julian Dadd was severely wounded in the war and died by suicide in 1937. The painting is now in the Tate Britain collection.

In other works

 The Queen song "The Fairy Feller's Master-Stroke" from the album Queen II was born of Freddie Mercury's appreciation of the work; it makes direct reference to the painting's characters as detailed in Dadd's poem.
 Terry Pratchett's novel The Wee Free Men contains a scene inspired by the painting.
 The painting, the art of the insane, and Dadd are mentioned in the novel, Mortal Love, by Elizabeth Hand.
 The work is a central plot element in the novel The Witches of Chiswick by Robert Rankin.
 Neil Gaiman wrote a tribute to the painting for the July/August edition of Intelligent Life magazine.
 The painting appears in Alex Bledsoe's Tufa novels.
 Former Gorky's Zygotic Mynci singer Euros Childs included an instrumental song titled "The Fairy Feller's Master-Stroke" on his 2009 solo album, Son of Euro Child.
 Mark Chadbourn's "The Fairy Feller's Master Stroke", about a contemporary young man looking for meanings in the painting, won the British Fantasy Award for best short story in 2003.
 Octavio Paz devoted a chapter on Richard Dadd and this painting in particular in his book The Monkey Grammarian.
 The Throbs album The Language of Thieves and Vagabonds cover art has fragments of the painting (Geffen Records, 1991).
 The penultimate issue of Alan Moore's The League of Extraordinary Gentlemen comics is titled after the painting and includes a sequence featuring the life of Dadd, who is depicted as being trapped in the painting following his death.
 The song “Dancing in the Temple”, by Swedish heavy metal band Candlemass is "inspired by Richard Dadd’s fantastic painting “The Fairy Feller’s Master Stroke” that [the band's bassist] Leif [Edling] saw at [the] Tate Gallery. Mr Edling and Freddie Mercury…what a pair!"

References

Bibliography
 Allderidge, Patricia (1974). Richard Dadd. New York and London: St. Martin's Press/Academy Editions.
MacGregor, John (1989). The Discovery of the Art of the Insane. Princeton University Press. 
Winkfield, Trevor (2014). Georges Braque and Others: The Selected Art Writings of Trevor Winkfield (1990–2009). New York: Song Cave. .

External links
Google Art Project: The Fairy Feller's Master-Stroke
Tate online: Sigmar Polke on Richard Dadd
Tate online: Richard Dadd
Excerpts of the poem in the context of Shakespeare from the English Department of Emory University
s:Elimination of a picture and its subject - called the feller's master stroke printed text

1864 paintings
Collection of the Tate galleries
Fantasy art
Unfinished paintings
Fairies in art